Ta Shek Wu is a village in Pat Heung, Yuen Long District, Hong Kong.

Administration
Ta Shek Wu is a recognized village under the New Territories Small House Policy.

References

External links
 Delineation of area of existing village Ta Shek Wu Tsuen (Pat Heung) for election of resident representative (2019 to 2022)

Villages in Yuen Long District, Hong Kong
Pat Heung